South Carolina Highway 145 (SC 145) is a  primary state highway in the U.S. state of South Carolina. It serves to connect Chesterfield with central Chesterfield County and McBee. The highway has been designated as the Carolina Sandhills Parkway by the SC General Assembly.

Route description
SC 145 is a two-lane rural highway that traverses from U.S. Route 1 (US 1) near McBee, through the county seat of Chesterfield, to the North Carolina state line. It also travels through forest and wildlife refuge areas. The entire route has been officially named the Carolinas Sandhills Parkway by the State of South Carolina.

History
The first SC 145 appeared in 1941 or 1942 as a new primary route from SC 644 to US 15 north of Walterboro. In 1948, it was downgraded to secondary status, known today as McLeod Road.

The current SC 145 was established in 1960 as a renumbering of SC 85; little has changed since.

South Carolina Highway 85

South Carolina Highway 85 (SC 85) was established in 1938 as a renumbering of SC 95, it traveled from US 1, near McBee, through Chesterfield, to the North Carolina state line, north-northeast of Chesterfield. In 1961, it was decommissioned and renumbered to SC 145 to match with NC 145.

Major intersections

See also

References

External links

145
Transportation in Chesterfield County, South Carolina
Chesterfield, South Carolina